Tarkasnawa was ruler of the Kingdom of Mira, and one of the last independent kings of Arzawa, a Bronze Age confederation of kingdoms in western Anatolia. He was probably the son of King Alantalli, and a contemporary of the later king Tudḫaliya IV. He was succeeded by Uhha-Ziti.

Tarkasnawa appears in the Karabel relief, where his name is inscribed in Luwian hieroglyphs. The inscription, next to the figure of the king, reads:

He is also known from various seals, one of them in which his name was formerly read "Tarkondemos". This is a bilingual seal, combining a cuneiform inscription on the rim and the corresponding Hittite hieroglyphs around the figure in royal dress, giving the name of the ruler:  Tarkasnawa. This bilingual inscription provided the first clues for deciphering Hittite hieroglyphs.

References

External links
The Arzawa Page
 The Relief of Sesostris

Kings of Arzawa
14th-century BC rulers